The 1943 South Carolina Gamecocks football team represented the University of South Carolina as a member of the Southern Conference (SoCon) in the 1943 college football season. Led by James Moran Sr. in his first and only season as head coach, the Gamecocks compiled an overall record of 5–2 with a mark of 2–1 in conference play, placing third in the SoCon. With the onset of World War II, former coach Rex Enright resigned to accept a Navy position.

Schedule

References

South Carolina
South Carolina Gamecocks football seasons
South Carolina Gamecocks football